Schistura bachmaensis is a species of ray-finned fish in the stone loach genus Schistura. It has been only been recorded in a single small stream with fast running water and boulders in Thua Thien Province of Vietnam.

References 

B
Fish described in 2001
Taxa named by Jörg Freyhof